Akinyele is a Local Government Area in Oyo State, Nigeria. It is one of the eleven local governments that make up Ibadan metropolis. Its headquarters are at Moniya. Akinyele local government area was created in 1976 and it shares boundaries with Afijio Local Government to the north, Lagelu Local Government Area to the east, Ido Local Government Area to the west and Ibadan North Local Government Area to the south. It occupies a land area of 464.892 square kilometers with a population density of 516 persons per square kilometer. Using 3.2% growth rate from 2006 census figures, the 2010 estimated population for the Local Government is 239,745.

It was named after the late Olubadan, Isaac Babalola Akinyele.

Akinyele local government area is subdivided into 12 wards: Ikereku, Olanla/Oboda/Labode, Arulogun/Eniosa/Aroro, Olode/Amosun/Onidundu, Ojo-Emo/Moniya, Akinyele/Isabiyi/Irepodun, Iwokoto/Talonta/Idi-oro, Ojoo/Ajibode/Laniba, Ijaye/Ojedeji, Ajibade/Alabata/Elekuru, Olorisa-Oko/Okegbemi/Mele, and Iroko.

The local government is governed by an elected chairman and 12 councilors, one elected from each ward.

Local Government Areas in Oyo State